Örjan Lüning (30 May 1919 − 24 September 1995) was a Swedish philatelist who was a specialist in aerophilately. In 1979 he was awarded the Crawford Medal for his work Luftpostens historia i Norden - The history of airmail in Scandinavia. His Large Gold Medal winning collection of pioneer flights and airmail of Scandinavia together with his Gold Medal collection of Denmark were sold by Corinphila in 2001.

He was also an architect, and his work was part of the architecture event in the art competition at the 1948 Summer Olympics.

Selected publications
Luftpostens historia i Norden - The history of airmail in Scandinavia. Stockholm: Sveriges filatelist-förbund, 1978.

References

External links
Air Posten historia in the Nordic region at Google Books.
History of Air Cargo and Airmail from the 18th Century, by Camille Allaz, at Google Books.

Airmail
Fellows of the Royal Philatelic Society London
1919 births
1995 deaths
Swedish philatelists
Olympic competitors in art competitions
20th-century Swedish architects